Henricus Loos served as the fifteenth Archbishop of Utrecht from 1858 to 1873. Together with Bishop Hermann Heykamp of Deventer, Loos is known as one of only two bishops whose orders were recognized by the Roman Catholic Church, but who were not invited to the First Vatican Council. Loos served as Archbishop of Utrecht during the first two Old Catholic Congresses in Munich in 1871 and in Cologne in 1872.

Death

References 

dfsf
19th-century archbishops
1873 deaths
Dutch Old Catholic bishops
sd<zsds